William Chamberlain may refer to:

 William Chamberlain (MP), (died 1445), MP for Truro and Southampton
 William Tankerville Chamberlain (1751–1802), Irish judge
 William Chamberlain (politician) (1755–1828), U.S. Representative from Vermont
 William Charles Chamberlain (1818–1878), Royal Navy rear admiral
 William H. Chamberlain (1931–1972), American politician
 William Chamberlain (technologist), author of the poetry-generating computer program Racter
 Bill Chamberlain (born 1949), retired American basketball player
 Bill Chamberlain (baseball) (1909–1994), Major League Baseball pitcher
 William Chamberlain (priest) (died 1666), canon of Windsor
 William Joseph Chamberlain (died 1945), English journalist and pacifist

See also
William Chamberlin (disambiguation)